The Nehalem River is a river on the Pacific coast of northwest Oregon in the United States, approximately  long. It drains part of the Northern Oregon Coast Range northwest of Portland, originating on the east side of the mountains and flowing in a loop around the north end of the range near the mouth of the Columbia River. Its watershed of  includes an important timber-producing region of Oregon that was the site of the Tillamook Burn. In its upper reaches it flows through a long narrow valley of small mountain communities but is unpopulated along most of its lower reaches inland from the coast. 

It rises in the northeast corner of Tillamook County, in the Tillamook State Forest. It initially flows northeast, across the northwest corner of Washington County and into western Columbia County, past Vernonia where it receives Rock Creek, it hooks to the northwest and west into Clatsop County, then flows southwest back into northern Tillamook County. Near its mouth on the Pacific, the river passes under U.S. Route 101.

It receives the Salmonberry River from the east in northern Tillamook County.

In 2007, a major storm caused the Salmonberry Bridge (located at ) to collapse.  The bridge was rebuilt and opened to traffic on May 14, 2012.

Nehalem is also used as the codename for Intel's first-generation line of Core processors.

See also
 List of rivers of Oregon
 List of longest streams of Oregon

References

External links

 Nehalem River Watershed Assessment (PDF)
 Nehalem Valley Historical Society
 Oregon Coast Atlas: Nehalem River Estuary

Oregon Coast
Rivers of Oregon
Rivers of Washington County, Oregon
Rivers of Clatsop County, Oregon
Rivers of Tillamook County, Oregon
Rivers of Columbia County, Oregon